The Copa América is South America's major tournament in senior men's soccer and determines the continental champion. Until 1967, the tournament was known as South American Championship. It is the oldest continental championship in the world.

Haiti are not members of the South American football confederation CONMEBOL. But because CONMEBOL only has ten member associations, guest nations have regularly been invited since 1993.

Record at the Copa América

1 Ecuador 1993 was the first time nations from outside the CONMEBOL were invited.
2 United States 2016 was the first time nations from outside the CONMEBOL could qualify and host.

Copa América Centenario

Group B

Haiti vs Peru
The two teams had met in four previous encounters, the last being a friendly in 2003 won by Peru 3–0. Both teams faced each other in an official tournament for the second time in history, after a 1–1 draw in a 2000 CONCACAF Gold Cup group stage match. This match marked Haiti's debut in Copa América, making them the second Caribbean team to appear at the tournament, after Jamaica in 2015.

Brazil vs Haiti
The two teams had met in only two previous occasions, both friendlies, the last held at the Stade Sylvio Cator in Port-au-Prince in 2004, which Brazil won 6–0.

Ecuador vs Haiti
The two teams had met in four previous encounters, the last being a friendly in 2008, which Ecuador won 3–1. This was the second match between both teams in an official tournament, as they already faced each other in a 2002 CONCACAF Gold Cup group stage match, won by Haiti 2–0.

References

External links
RSSSF archives and results
Soccerway database

Countries at the Copa América
Copa America